Adult Crash is the third album by New York City band, Leeway. It was released in October, 1994 on Bulletproof Records and follows Desperate Measures. It was followed by 1995's Open Mouth Kiss.

Track listing
 All songs written by A.J. Novello, Eddie Sutton, and Jimmy Xanthos, unless stated otherwise
"Simple Life?" – 4:14     
"You" – 3:52
"Make a Move" – 3:37    
"3 Wishes" (Novello, Sutton) – 4:33     
"Withering Heights" – 5:27
"10 Years" – 5:11       
"Silver Tongue" (Novello, Sutton) – 1:44     
"Grip" – 2:57     
"The Roulaison" (Novello, Xanthos) – 7:22     
"Clueless" – 3:51

Credits
 Eddie Sutton – vocals
 A.J. Novello – guitar
 Jimmy Xanthos – bass
 Pokey – drums
 Recorded at Normandy Sound and Nola Studios, Warren, Rhode Island, U.S.
 Produced and engineered by Phil Burnett and A.J. Novello
 Additionally engineered by Tom Soares and Noah Evans
 Assistant engineered by Tony Gonzalez and Fred Bortolotti
 Mixed and mastered by Phil Burnett

References

External links
[ Allmusic Guide album entry]
Encyclopaedia Metallum album entry
Leeway official website
BNR Metal discography page

1994 albums
Leeway (band) albums